Lakeland Village is a census-designated place (CDP) in Riverside County, California, United States. The population was 11,541 at the 2010 census, more than double the 5,626 reported at the 2000 census.

Geography
It is next to the city of Lake Elsinore

Demographics

2010
At the 2010 census Lakeland Village had a population of 11,541. The racial makeup of Lakeland Village was 7,764 (67.3%) White, 285 (2.5%) African American, 131 (1.1%) Native American, 168 (1.5%) Asian, 21 (0.2%) Pacific Islander, 2,575 (22.3%) from other races, and 597 (5.2%) from two or more races. Hispanic or Latino of any race were 5,114 persons (44.3%).

The census reported that 11,403 people (98.8% of the population) lived in households, 4 (0%) lived in non-institutionalized group quarters, and 134 (1.2%) were institutionalized.

There were 3,538 households, 1,547 (43.7%) had children under the age of 18 living in them, 1,815 (51.3%) were opposite-sex married couples living together, 538 (15.2%) had a female householder with no husband present, 281 (7.9%) had a male householder with no wife present.  There were 343 (9.7%) unmarried opposite-sex partnerships, and 24 (0.7%) same-sex married couples or partnerships. 623 households (17.6%) were one person and 180 (5.1%) had someone living alone who was 65 or older. The average household size was 3.22.  There were 2,634 families (74.4% of households); the average family size was 3.62.

The age distribution was 3,267 people (28.3%) under the age of 18, 1,216 people (10.5%) aged 18 to 24, 3,070 people (26.6%) aged 25 to 44, 3,076 people (26.7%) aged 45 to 64, and 912 people (7.9%) who were 65 or older.  The median age was 33.0 years. For every 100 females, there were 103.3 males.  For every 100 females age 18 and over, there were 103.3 males.

There were 3,967 housing units at an average density of 454.0 per square mile, of the occupied units 2,284 (64.6%) were owner-occupied and 1,254 (35.4%) were rented. The homeowner vacancy rate was 3.8%; the rental vacancy rate was 9.3%.  7,152 people (62.0% of the population) lived in owner-occupied housing units and 4,251 people (36.8%) lived in rental housing units.

2000
At the 2000 census there were 5,626 people, 1,966 households, and 1,338 families in the CDP. The racial makeup of the CDP was 79.0% White, 1.8% African American, 1.6% Native American, 1.0% Asian, 0.1% Pacific Islander, 12.7% from other races, and 3.8% from two or more races. Hispanic or Latino of any race were 31.0%.

Of the 1,966 households 38.6% had children under the age of 18 living with them, 49.9% were married couples living together, 11.8% had a female householder with no husband present, and 31.9% were non-families. 23.8% of households were one person and 7.6% were one person aged 65 or older. The average household size was 2.9 and the average family size was 3.4.

The age distribution was 30.9% under the age of 18, 8.6% from 18 to 24, 31.4% from 25 to 44, 20.0% from 45 to 64, and 9.1% 65 or older. The median age was 33 years. For every 100 females, there were 103.3 males. For every 100 females age 18 and over, there were 102.2 males.

The median household income was $34,136 and the median family income  was $36,528. Males had a median income of $31,634 versus $26,356 for females. The per capita income for the CDP was $14,922. About 14.3% of families and 16.5% of the population were below the poverty line, including 19.2% of those under age 18 and 10.8% of those age 65 or over.

Government

References

Census-designated places in Riverside County, California
Census-designated places in California